The white-tailed alethe (Alethe diademata) is a species of bird in the Old World flycatcher family Muscicapidae. It is found in western Africa from Senegal to Togo. Its natural habitat is subtropical or tropical moist lowland forests.

It was recently split into two species from the fire-crested alethe (A. castanea).

References

white-tailed alethe
Birds of West Africa
white-tailed alethe
white-tailed alethe
Taxonomy articles created by Polbot